The 2015 TEAN International was a professional tennis tournament played on outdoor clay courts. It was the 20th edition of the tournament which was part of the 2015 ATP Challenger Tour and the 15th edition of the tournament for the 2015 ITF Women's Circuit. It took place in Alphen aan den Rijn, Netherlands, on 7 – 13 September 2015.

ATP singles main draw entrants

Seeds

 1 Rankings are as of August 31, 2015.

Other entrants
The following players received wildcards into the singles main draw: 
  Tallon Griekspoor
  Thomas Schoorel 
  Jelle Sels
  Vincent Van den Honert

The following players received entry from the qualifying draw:
  Romain Barbosa
  Eduardo Dischinger
  Marcin Gawron
  Vadym Ursu

WTA singles main draw entrants

Seeds

 1 Rankings are as of August 31, 2015.

Other entrants 
The following players received wildcards into the singles main draw:
  Nikki Luttikhuis
  Kelly Versteeg
  Eva Wacanno
  Mandy Wagemaker

The following players received entry from the qualifying draw:
  Chayenne Ewijk
  Laëtitia Sarrazin
  Zoë Gwen Scandalis
  Anastasia Smirnova
  Iana Tishchenko
  Caroline Übelhör
  Natália Vajdová
  Bibiane Weijers

Champions

Men's singles 

  Damir Džumhur def.  Igor Sijsling 6–1, 2–6, 6–1

Women's singles 
  Marie Benoît def.  Tena Lukas 5–7, 6–3, 6–4

Men's doubles 

  Tobias Kamke /  Jan-Lennard Struff def.  Victor Hănescu /  Adrian Ungur 7–6(7–1), 4–6, [10–7]

Women's doubles 
  Quirine Lemoine /  Eva Wacanno def.  Lesley Kerkhove /  Arantxa Rus 3–6, 6–4, [10–7]

External links 
 Official website

2015
2015 ATP Challenger Tour
2015 ITF Women's Circuit
2015 in Dutch tennis